1/2 may refer to:

 One half ( or ½)
 January 2 (month-day date notation) 
 1 February (day-month date notation)
 1st Battalion 2nd Marines
 1 shilling and 2 pence in British predecimal currency